Aeolochroma mniaria is a moth of the family Geometridae first described by Gilbert M. Goldfinch in 1929. It is found in New South Wales, Australia.

The wingspan is 40 mm. Adult moths have pale brown wings with a complex pattern of scalloped dark brown lines.

References

Moths described in 1929
Pseudoterpnini
Moths of Australia